The Oi Formation is a palaeontological formation located in the Ichishi region of Central Japan. It is part of the Miocene Ichishi Group, which dates to the Lower Miocene period. The Kamimitsugano tuffaceous sandstone members of the Oi Formation were found to contain two of the oldest fossils of still existent species (the Ophiomusium lymani and Ophiochiton cf. fastigatus).

See also 
 List of fossil sites

References

Further reading 
  (1993); Wildlife of Gondwana. Reed. 

Geologic formations of Japan
Neogene System of Asia
Neogene Japan
Miocene Series
Paleontology in Japan